Massimilla "Milla" Baldo-Ceolin (12 August 1924, Legnago, Italy – 25 November 2011) was an Italian particle physicist.
 
She was the daughter to the owner of a small mechanical workshop.

Biography
Baldo-Ceolin graduated from the University of Padua in 1952 and six years later (1958) became a professor in physics in the same university. In 1963, she was the first female to have a professorship (Chair of Physics Department) in the university.

The discovery of the proton and neutron antiparticles led Baldo-Ceolin to co-discover antilambda, the first antihyperon, with Derek Prowse after a 1957 conference.

In the 1970s she was attracted by neutrino physics. She entered the NUE experiment at CERN, where she worked within Helmut Fraisser's team to determine a value for the Weinberg angle. Baldo-Ceolin was also part of the Italian-French-Dutch-Norwegian collaboration regarding the Super Proton Synchrotron at CERN. This collaboration used a liquid deuterium bubble chamber to explore neutrino interactions with protons and neutrons.

In 1976 she started an experiment for the observation of electron-muon-neutrino oscillations, which later continued running with NOMAD's collaboration contribution (Neutrino Oscillation MAgnetic Detector). Baldo-Ceolin was given the opportunity to unfold her leading abilities during that collaborative project.

She also supported the development of the ICARUS experiment and its installation in the Gran Sasso laboratory.

In Padua, from 1965-1968 she was Head of the local section of the Istituto Nazionale di Fisica Nucleare (INFN) and 1973-1978 Head of the Physics Department.

In 1998, she initiated the series of international workshops on neutrino telescopes at the Istituto Veneto di Scienze, Lettere ed Arti. Amongst others, she had been coordinator of the European Networks of neutrino oscillators.

When Baldo-Ceolin died she was still a Professor Emeritus in the University of Padua, a role attributed to her in 1998.

Awards
Throughout her career Baldo-Ceolin received the following awards:

1976: Awarded the Feltrinelli Prize by the Accademia dei Lincei
1978: Gold Medal for Education and Arts (Benemeriti della Scuola, della Cultura e dell'Arte)
1995: Gold Medal for Science (Benemeriti della Scienza e della Cultura)
2007: Enrico Fermi Prize of the Italian Physical Society

References

External links
Scientific publications of Milla Baldo-Ceolin on INSPIRE-HEP

1924 births
2011 deaths
People from Legnago
Particle physicists
Italian women physicists
People associated with CERN
20th-century  Italian physicists
20th-century Italian women scientists
Academic staff of the University of Padua